Rafael Honorio Caupolican Ovalles Colmenares (born April 24, 1936 Guarenas, Venezuela - died February 23, 2001 Caracas, Venezuela) was a controversial Venezuelan writer. He belonged to the avant-garde period of the sixties and was influenced by French Surrealism and American Beatnik.

He actively participated in literary and artistic groups of the time such as The Roof of the Whale  and La República del Este, among the most known. His most famous poetry works are ¿Duerme usted, señor presidente? (1962)   and Elegía a la muerte de Guatimocín, mi padre, alias El Globo (1967). In 1973 he received the National Prize for Literature (Venezuela) for his collection of poems Copa de Huesos (1972).

Literary Groups

Sardio 
Sardio (1954-1961) was created as a literary group opposed to Marcos Pérez Jimenez's dictatorial government. The proposal of Sardio was both politic and aesthetic. After the dictatorship ended in 1958, they published a homonymous magazine (1958-1961) with eight issues. Later, they separated for political reasons.
The group was made up by several poets, writers and painters, including Guillermo Sucre, Gonzalo Castellanos, Elisa Lerner, Salvador Garmendia, Caupolicán Ovalles, Adriano González León, Luis García Morales, Rómulo Aranguibel, Efraín Hurtado, Antonio Pasquali, Francisco Pérez Perdomo, Rodolfo Izaguirre, and Edmundo Aray.
Caupolicán was a member of the Editorial Board of Sardio's last issue. The first manifesto of El Techo de la Ballena was published in the last page of that issue.

El Techo de la Ballena 
El Techo de la Ballena (1961-1968) arises as a literary and artistic group conformed by some of the left-wing members of Sardio, including Caupolicán. The group published three issues of the magazine  Rayado sobre el Techo. On March 24, 1961 El Techo de la Ballena opens its first exhibition entitled “Para restituir el magma”, at the same time the first manifesto was published in El Techo de la Ballena has been described by the critics as an avant-garde group with revolutionary purposes and multidisciplinary media. It was very active between 1961 and 1965. Among its most explosive expressions is [http://arquitrave.com/entrevistas/arquientrevista_Contramaestre.html“El Homenaje a la Necrofilia”, by Carlos Contramaestre.
Some of its most important members were Adriano González León, Alberto Brandt, Carlos Contramaestre, Caupolicán Ovalles, Dámaso Ogaz, Daniel González, Edmundo Aray, Efraín Hurtado, Francisco Pérez Perdomo, Rodolfo Izaguirre and Salvador Garmendia, among others.

Sol cuello cortado
Sol cuello cortado (1964), a poetry magazine that appeared at the same time as El Techo de la Ballena, published six issues. It was founded by Caupolicán Ovalles and Héctor Silva Michelena; later, Ludovico Silva and Alfredo Silva Estrada contributed to the magazine.

La Pandilla de Lautréamont
La Pandilla de Lautréamont emerges after the disintegration of El Techo de la Ballena. Gathering around a literary magazine was not working, as was the case of Sardio, El Techo de la Ballena and Sol cuello cortado. After meeting the nadaístas in Colombia, Caupolicán realizes that it was necessary to create an open group, which was related to society and not revolving around an aesthetic expression but around conversation. Victor Valera Mora, Carlos Noguera, Luis Camilo Guevara, Mario Abreu, José Barroeta, and Elí Galindo joined the so-called Pandilla de Lautréamont. The group used to gather at a bar in Sabana Grande called El Viñedo. At one of those gatherings held in October 1968 Caupolicán appointed himself President of the newly founded República del Este.

La República del Este 
Established as an open group, La República del Este was located at the so-called Bermuda Triangle of Sabana Grande (Franco's, Camilo's and Il Vecchio Mulino bars and restaurants). It was intended to found a republic diametrically opposed to the one that officiated at the Palace of Miraflores, located in the West of Caracas. They edited five numbers of a homonymous magazine, in which Caupolicán Ovalles and Adriano González León participated as consultants.

The Association of Venezuelan Writers publicly acknowledged La República del Este in 1970. That same year, the population of La República grew up, as a result of the Renewal of the School of Literature (Central University of Venezuela). But the highest increase in population occurred in 1974: people of all kinds having no relation with the political-literary origin of the group joined it. In 1973 the coup d’état became a form of government at La República del Este.

Despite the profuse inflow of people arriving to the group, the permanent members were Adriano González León, Andrés Aguilar, Argimiro Briceño León, Caupolicán Ovalles, Daniel González, David Alizo, Denzil Romero, Enrique Hernández D’Jesus, Elí Galindo, Elías Vallés, Héctor Myerston, la Negra Maggi, Luis Camilo Guevara, Luis Correa, Luis Salazar, Luis Sutherland, Manuel Alfredo Rodríguez, Manuel Matute, Mary Ferrero, Mateo Manaure, Orlando Araujo, Paco Benmamán, Pepe Luis Garrido, Rubén Osorio Canales, Salvador Garmendia, Miyó Vestrini, Víctor Valera Mora, among others.

In 1973, La República del Este's institutionality teeters and the coups d’état became customary. Caupolicán himself says in an interview conducted by Mary Ferrero in this regard: “I legalized the coup d’état as a valid weapon, I ended the administrative framework, established a new international order. The triumph of my candidacy meant anarchy and the victory of surreal thought”.

Works 
1962: ¿Duerme usted, señor presidente? Ediciones del Techo de la Ballena.
1963: En uso de razón. Ediciones Tubulares N° 1.
1967 Elegía en rojo a la muerte Guatimocín, mi padre, alias El Globo. Ediciones del Techo de la Ballena.
1972: Copa de huesos. Profanaciones. Editorial La Gran Papelería del Mundo.
1973: Diario de Praga u sexto sentido. Ediciones UCV.
1973: ¡Ha muerto un colmenar de la colmena! Ediciones en Homenaje a Rafael José Colmenares.
1980: Canción anónima / Para canción / Canción para Evita Paraíso / Los mil picos de agua. Ediciones de La Gran Papelería del Mundo.
1980: El pumpá volador de Armando. Ediciones María de Mase.
1986: Yo, Bolívar rey. Contexto Audiovisual III.
1989: Convertido en pez viví enamorado del desierto. Ediciones UCV.
1996: Usted me debe esa cárcel, Conversaciones en La Ahumada. Rayuela Taller de Ediciones.
1998: El Almirante duende. Rayuela Taller de Ediciones.
2001: Alfabetarium. La Casa Nacional de las Letras. (póstumo)
2016: En (des)uso de la razón. Antología poética y otros textos. Rayuela Taller de Ediciones.

References

 Figuras del siglo XX en la literatura venezolana, por Carmen Virginia Carrillo
 Grupos artistico-literarios de la Venezuela de los sesenta, por Carmen Virginia Carrillo
La subversión, entre la ética y la estética. A propósito de la obra poética de Caupolicán Ovalles, por Carmen Virginia Carrillo
Agresividad verbal en la poesía venezolana de los años 60, de Sardio a El techo de la ballena, por William Martínez
Imaginarios contemporáneos de Simón Bolívar. Una aproximación desde la novela Yo, Bolívar rey de Caupolicán Ovalles, por Yudis Contreras y Juan Barreto
Literatura y política en el Techo de la ballena, por Octaviano Tiamo
Sardio. Un compromiso artístico y político, por Yasmine Vandorpe
La patria bohemia que nació derrotada. Semblanza de grupo de la República del Este (tesis), Lissy de Abreu y Aline Dos Reis
El Techo de la Ballena, un cortometraje documental por Luis Alejandro Rodríguez
Una rayuela que se borra y se vuelve a dibujar cada día. Semblanza de lugar sobre la transformación urbanística y cultural de Sabana Grande (tesis), por Verónica Rodríguez y Carla Valero
Entrevista con Caupolicán Ovalles, por Carmen Virginia Carrillo
Caupolicán Ovalles: “¿Duerme Usted señor Presidente? “Haga preso a ese carajo”, por Mario Valdez
Camaleón por naturaleza, por Andrea Hernández
Recuerdos de Caupolicán Ovalles, por Asdrúbal González
"Es necesario defender y exaltar la cultura de la cual formamos parte". Entrevista con Rodolfo Izaguirre, por Carmen Virginia Carrillo
República del Este, por J. J. Armas Marcelo
Yo, Bolívar Rey, por J. J. Armas Marcelo
Al este de Caracas, J. J. Armas Marcelo
El gran Caupolicán, J. J. Armas Marcelo
J.J. Armas Marcelo: La grandeza de Caupolicán Ovalles
El Techo de la Ballena y la República del Este, por J.J. Armas Marcelo
Caupolicán, rey del fuego, por Miguel Chillida
La República del Este (re-vision), por Igor Delgado Senior
Nueva Antología de El Techo de la Ballena, por Edmundo Aray
Mira mi guerrillera, por Caupolicán Ovalles 
Entrevista de Adrino Gonzalez Leon sobre El Techo de la Ballena
Elogio a la locura de Cajigal de mi tío Caupolicán, por Argimiro Arratia Quesada
(Sur)Realismo en la poesía venezolana del 58, por Paul W. Borgeson, JR. University of Illinois at Urbana
"La belleza del arpón" de Miguel Marcotrigiano
"Caupolicán Ovalles, grosso modo" de Miguel Chillida
Publican una antología de la obra poética de Caupolicán Ovalles
Antología digna de un Poeta-Hostias
Caupolicán Ovalles y el exilio, por Diosce Martinez 
Primero fue Posada al viento, por Néstor Mendoza 
El delirio de Caupolicán Ovalles vuelve para agitar las mentes, por Diana Moncada
La posibilidad fulminante de escribir de Caupolicán Ovalles, por David Tortosa 
“The Roof of the Whale”: El Techo de la Ballena and the Venezuelan Avant-Garde, 1961–1969
Para Caupolicán Ovalles ¡LOS GUSANOS Y EL GRITO DE DADA!, por Rodolfo Izaguirre
Caupolicán, poeta-hostias, señor del escándalo, por Víctor Alarcón @vicalar 
LITERATURA En la presentación del libro En des(uso) de razón: El Caupo sigue vigente en su mensaje y legado
Edmundo Aray: de la vida y aventuras de El Techo de la Ballena
Conociendo a Caupolicán, por Boris Muñoz
Los tres manifiestos de El Techo de la Ballena, por Maguy Blanco Fombona 
El poeta de la calle de Venezuela, por Angel Vivas
Poética de la subversión y vino de Extremadura, por Sebastián de la Nuez
Memorias de las noches republicanas CAUPO, EL POETA CAUDILLO, por Ángel Gustavo Infante

External links
 CHIVO/RegistroCompleto/tabid/99/doc/1060710/language/es-MX/Default.aspx Rayado sobre el Techo N°1]

Acknowledgements 
1973: National Prize for Literature (Venezuela) for the poetry compilation Copa de huesos. Profanaciones.

1936 births
2001 deaths
Venezuelan writers